The men's ne-waza 77 kilograms Ju-jitsu competition at the 2018 Asian Games in Jakarta was held on 26 August 2018 at the Jakarta Convention Center Assembly Hall. Ju-jitsu made its debut at the 2018 Asian Games. Earlier, it was incorporated into the 2017 Asian Indoor and Martial Arts Games.

Schedule
All times are Western Indonesia Time (UTC+07:00)

Results
Legend
DQ — Won by disqualification

Main bracket

Finals

Top half

Section 1

Section 2

Bottom half

Section 3

Section 4

Repechage

 Aiazbek Mustakov of Kyrgyzstan originally won the silver medal, but was disqualified after she tested positive for Metandienone and GW501516.

References

External links
Results
Official website

men's 77 kg